Banca is a commune in Vaslui County, Western Moldavia, Romania. It is composed of twelve villages: Banca, Gara Banca (the commune centre), Ghermănești, Miclești, Mitoc, Satu Nou (depopulated as of 2002), Sălcioara, Sârbi, Stoișești, Strâmtura-Mitoc, Țifu and 1 Decembrie (30 Decembrie during the Communist era).

The commune was formed in 1968 by merging the communes of Banca, Sârbi and Stoișești.

References

Communes in Vaslui County
Localities in Western Moldavia